The École Française Internationale de Canton(EFIC) is a French international school located in "the paradiso", Baiyun District, Guangzhou. It serves levels maternelle (preschool) until lycée (senior high school). It was established in 1997. In 2016 it had 150 students.

It was previously in the Favorview area of Tianhe District. Before then, it was located at the GoldArch Riverdale development on Ersha Island, Yuexiu District.

It has direct education from toute petite section (less than 3 years) until quatrième, then uses CNED from troisième until terminale.

See also
 Lycée Français International de Pékin
 Lycée Français de Shanghai

Notes

References

External links
 École Française Internationale de Canton 
 

Guangzhou
French
1997 establishments in China
Educational institutions established in 1997
Private schools in Guangdong